Palazzo Natoli is a Baroque palace in Palermo, in the Mediterranean island of Sicily. It was built by Vincenzo Natoli in 1765. It has a fine entrance on via S. Salvatore,  and frescoes by Gioacchino Martorana.

References

Further reading 

 A. Gerbino, Palazzo Natoli. Un itinerario settecentesco e un pittore contemporaneo, Ed. Sciascia, 1994
 Diana Malignaggi: La pitture del Settecento a Palermo. Attività divulgativa e didattica 1978, Soprintendenza ai Beni Artistici e Storici, Palermo 1978
 Angela Mazzé: Memoria di Gioacchino Martorana. A cura di Roberto Petricolo. Soprintendenza ai Beni Artistici e Storici, Palermo 1979
 M. di Natale, La pittura dell'Ottocento in Sicilia: tra committenza, critica d'arte e collezionismo, Flaccovio, 2005

Houses completed in 1765
Natoli